Sandy Township, Ohio may refer to:

Sandy Township, Stark County, Ohio
Sandy Township, Tuscarawas County, Ohio

Ohio township disambiguation pages